The Hum Honorary Most Challenging Subject Award is given by the Board of Directors of the Hum Television Network and Entertainment Channel (HTNEC) to the Hum Television Network most challenging and most important
subjective based work. The recipients of this award are usually director's, producer's and writers of most promising work of Hum TV.

This is one of the Special Award given by the Channel directors to the work of exceptional achievements. All the categorized and organized special award is awarded annually during the ceremony.

Hum Honorary Most Challenging Subject Award incepted with the origin of first Awards, and it may not be awarded every year, it is one of the category that is only based on the special inaugurated work of the year, this award may have irregular wins.

Recipients

Following is the listing of the recipients of Hum Honorary Most Challenging Subject Award:

2010s

Note: The † symbol indicates a posthumous awarded.

See also

 Hum Awards
 1st Hum Awards

References

External links
Official websites
 Hum Awards official website
Other resources
 

Hum Award winners
Hum Awards